Organoscandium chemistry is an area with organometallic compounds focused on compounds with at least on carbon to scandium chemical bond. The interest in organoscandium compounds is mostly academic but motivated by potential practical applications in catalysis, especially in polymerization. A common precursor is scandium chloride, especially its THF complex. 

As with the other elements in group 3 – e.g. yttrium, forming organoyttrium compounds – and the lanthanides, the dominant oxidation state for scandium in organometallic compounds is +3 (electron configuration [Ar] 3d14s2). The members of this group also have large ionic radii with vacant s,p and d orbitals (88 pm for Sc3+ compared to 67 pm for Al3+) and as a result they behave as hard Lewis acids and tend to have high coordination numbers of 9 to 12. The metal to ligand chemical bond is largely ionic.

Illustrative complexes

Sc(III) derivatives
Many organoscandium(III) compounds have at least one cyclopentadienyl-type ligand. The reaction of scandium trichloride with two equivalents of sodium cyclopentadienide (NaCp) produces the chloride-bridged dimer:
2ScCl3 + 4NaCp → [Cp2Sc(μ-Cl)]2 + 4NaCl
Cp3Sc is a polymer wherein one third of the Cp ligands serving as bridging ligands.

Bulkier cyclopentadienide ligands give monoscandium derivatives, e.g. (C5Me5)2ScCl.  The corresponding alkyls polymerize alkenes.

The synthesis of a tris(allyl)scandium complex is analogous to the above methods, involving the reaction of ScCl3 with allyl potassium in THF solution, The product is Sc(C3H5)3(THF)2 wherein two allyl ligands are η3 coordinated and one allyl ligand is η1.

Sc(II) and Sc(I) derivatives
Organoscandium compounds in lower oxidation states have been prepared.

References